Kuterintja is an extinct genus of marsupial of the family Ilariidae. Only one species has been described, Kuterintja ngama, from Late Oligocene of Australia.

References

 Archer, M.; Flannery, T.; Hand, S.; Long, J. Prehistoric Mammals of Australia and New Guinea: One Hundred Million Years of Evolution. UNSW Press, 2002. 244 pages.

Prehistoric vombatiforms
Riversleigh fauna
Oligocene marsupials
Prehistoric marsupial genera
Fossil taxa described in 1987